Robert Anthony Rodriguez is an American film and television director, producer, writer, composer, cinematographer and editor. He has contributed to many projects as a combination of the six. Less commonly, Rodriguez has also worked as a second unit director, digital animator and a visual effects supervisor.

Despite being rejected from the University of Texas' film school due to poor academic promise of the Arts, Robert Rodriguez created his first 16mm short film Bedhead which opened many doors for him. Rodriguez then created his first feature-length film El Mariachi which was picked up by Columbia Pictures. After directing the television film Roadracers, Rodriguez continued work in Hollywood.

El Mariachi was the first of Rodriguez's Mexico Trilogy that included Desperado and Once Upon a Time in Mexico. Rodriguez continued working on several other film series including the crime-horror film hybrid From Dusk Till Dawn and the family-oriented adventure film series Spy Kids. Rodriguez has also collaborated with film director Quentin Tarantino on various projects including Four Rooms, From Dusk Till Dawn, Kill Bill: Volume 2, Sin City and Grindhouse.

Filmography

Films

Short films

Acting roles

Uncredited works

Television

Acting roles

Music videos

See also
Cinema of the United States

References
General

Specific

External links
Robert Rodriguez at Allmovie

Male actor filmographies
Director filmographies
Filmography
American filmographies